Carolyn Wright (born 1946) is an Australian high jumper.

Carolyn Wright may also refer to:

 Carolyn Wright (Chief Justice) (born 1946), Chief Justice of the Fifth Court of Appeals of Texas
 Carolyn D. Wright (1949–2016), American poet
 Carolyne Wright ((born 1949), American poet

See also
 Carol Wright (disambiguation)
 Carolyne Wright (born 1949), American poet